Kenya competed at the 1980 Summer Paralympics in Arnhem, Netherlands.  The seventeen member strong tem competed in athletics, weightlifting, lawn bowls and table tennis, claiming a gold medal and two silver medals.   Lucy Wanjiru 's gold in the Women's Javelin 3 event was the first gold earned by a Kenyan woman at the Paralympic Games.

Team 
Kenya made their second Paralympic Games appearance in Arnhem, Netherlands.  They were returning to the Games, having boycotted the 1976 Summer Paralympics as a result of a broader boycott by the Kenyan Olympic Committee for the 1976 Summer Olympics. The team was seventeen strong, and included thirteen men and four women.  They competed in athletics, weightlifting, lawn bowls and table tennis.

Medals 
17 competitors from Kenya won 3 medals, 1 gold and 2 silver, and finished 30th in the medal table. Lucy Wanjiru won the first gold medal by a Kenyan woman after winning the Women's Javelin 3 event.

Athletics 
Sixteen of the country's seventeen Paralympians competed in athletics in Germany.  It was the only sport where Kenya medaled at these Games. Japheth Musyoki won a pair of silver medals for Kenya, one Men's Discus Throw 3 and another in the Men's Shot Put 3.  Lucy Wanjiru won the first gold medal by a Kenyan woman after winning the Women's Javelin 3 event.

Lawn bowls 
Two Kenyan athletes, Godfrey Ithongo and Maurice Kamia, competed in lawn bowls in Germany.  Neither medaled.  Maurice Kamia was the only member of the team that had participated at Kenya's Paralympic debut in 1972.  He had only participated in athletics at those Games.

Table tennis 
Kenya was represented by two table tennis players in Germany, Timothy Ngumba and B. Owabucheli.

Weightlifting 
Kenya was represented by two weightlifters in Germany, Christopher Kipkemboi and Christopher Kipkemboi.

See also 
 Kenya at the Paralympics

References 

Kenya at the Paralympics
Nations at the 1980 Summer Paralympics
1980 in Kenyan sport